Mons Vinogradov is a rugged massif that is located on the lunar mare where Oceanus Procellarum to the southwest joins Mare Imbrium to the east. There are three primary peaks in this formation, which rise to altitudes of 1.0–1.4 km above the surface (3,281-4593 ft). To the east of this rise is the crater Euler, and to the southeast is an area of rugged ground that reaches the Montes Carpatus range. The Carpatus mountain range forms the southwest boundary of the Mare Imbrium.

The selenographic coordinate of Mons Vinogradov is 22.4 N, 32.4 W, and it has a maximum diameter of 25 km at the base. It was named after Soviet geochemist Aleksandr P. Vinogradov. This mountain was formerly named Euler Beta (β), or Mons Euler.

In the rugged ground just to the southeast of this mountain is a set of craters that have been assigned names by the IAU. These are listed in the table below.

Notes

See also
 List of mountains on the Moon by height

References

External links
 
 LTO-39C2 Mons Vinogradov — L&PI topographic map of mountain and vicinity.

Vinogradov, Mons